Bø Station is a railway station located in Midt-Telemark in Vestfold og Telemark, Norway on Sørlandet Line. The station is served by express trains to Kristiansand as well as serving as a major transport hub in western Telemark.

History
The station was opened in 1924 when Sørlandet Line was opened to Bø, and was the terminal station until Lunde Station opened in 1925.

External links
 Jernbaneverket entry 
 NSB entry
 Norsk Jernbaneklubb entry

Railway stations on the Sørlandet Line
Railway stations in Vestfold og Telemark
Railway stations opened in 1924
1924 establishments in Norway
Bø, Telemark